Leonard Glick is an American anthropologist, historian of ideas, and author. He served as professor of anthropology at Hampshire College from 1972 to 2002. His scholarly work predominantly focuses on the history of Judaism.

Notable work

Abraham's Heirs: Jews and Christians in Medieval Europe 
Glick published Abraham's Heirs: Jews And Christians In Medieval Europe in 1999, focusing on the interaction between Jews and Christians during the 5th to 15th century.

The book argues that the Jewish experience was profoundly shaped by the overwhelmingly medieval Christian majority.

Marked in Your Flesh: Circumcision From Ancient Judea To Modern America 
Glick published Marked In Your Flesh: Circumcision From Ancient Judea To Modern America in 2005. It deals with the history of brit milah.

He theorizes that milah originated during the Babylonian exile among the Judean priests who are believed to have composed the P source of the Torah. And that the main justification among Jewish philosophers and religious leaders lies in beliefs surrounding the control of male sexuality, as a visual marker of the Abrahamic covenant, beliefs surrounding fertility, and a sign of the father submitting to the political social order.

Personal life 
Glick is a Reform Jew. He has three sons.

Works 

 (1973). Beyond The Classics: Essays In The Scientific Study Of Religion
 (1974). Jewish Life And Culture In Eastern Europe
 (1980). An Automotive Camshaft Degreeing Fixture (1999). Abraham's Heirs: Jews and Christians In Medieval Europe 
 (2005). Marked in Your Flesh: Circumcision From Ancient Judea To Modern America''

References 

20th-century American anthropologists
Living people
American historians of religion
American Reform Jews
Year of birth missing (living people)
Historians of Jews and Judaism
20th-century American historians
21st-century American anthropologists
21st-century American historians
20th-century American male writers
21st-century American male writers
American male non-fiction writers
Hampshire College faculty